The Buloh Kasap Bridge is a historical bridge in Malaysia, made famous during World War II. It is located on Federal Route 1 in the town of Buloh Kasap, Segamat District, Johor, Malaysia. The bridge is built across Muar River (Sungai Muar) which flows pass Buloh Kasap.

The old Buloh Kasap bridge was built by the Johor Government and built by the Federal Malay States Public Works Department during the construction of Federal Route 1 This bridge was first built in 1926 and completed in 1930. In 1938 , the bridge was inaugurated by the Sultan of Johore in conjunction with the completion of the Federal Route 1 from Bukit Kayu Hitam to Johor Bahru.  However, the Allied soldiers demolished a part of the bridge during World War II to stop the advance of Japanese soldiers from moving forward to Singapore. After the war ended, the bridge was repaired. During the floods in 1964, the wooden bridge was badly damaged and temporarily replaced with a bailey bridge while a new bridge was being constructed next to it. In a short span the new bridge was ready to be used and the old bridge was left in a state of disrepair and till today it exists as a historical sight.

When the stretch of Federal Route 1 was upgraded from Gemas to Ayer Hitam recently, the bridge was upgraded to a single-lane dual carriageway bridge to fulfil the latest standards of Malaysian federal roads.

See also
 Transport in Malaysia

Bridges in Johor
Segamat District